Samoa competed at the 2018 Commonwealth Games in the Gold Coast, Australia from April 4 to April 15, 2018.

Weightlifter Lauititi Lui was the island's flag bearer during the opening ceremony.

Competitors
The following is the list of number of competitors participating at the Games per sport/discipline.

Medalists

|  style="text-align:left; vertical-align:top;"|

Athletics

Samoa participated with 6 athletes (6 men).

Men
Track & road events

Field events

Boxing

Samoa participated with a team of 4 athletes (4 men).

Men

Lawn bowls

Samoa will compete in Lawn bowls.

Rugby sevens

Men's tournament

Samoa qualified a men's team of 12 athletes by being among the top nine ranked nations from the Commonwealth in the 2016–17 World Rugby Sevens Series ranking.

Roster

David Afamasaga
Elisapeta Alofipo
Tomasi Alosio Logotuli
Neira Fomai
Laaloi Leilua
Tila Mealoi
Alamanda Motuga
Murphy Paulo
Paul Perez
Tofatu Solia
Alatasi Tupou
Jacob Whitaker Ale

Pool B

Shooting

Samoa participated with 4 athletes (4 men).

Men

Swimming

Samoa participated with 3 athletes (1 man and 2 women).

Men

Women

Weightlifting

Samoa participated with 6 athletes (5 men and 1 woman).

Men

Women

See also
Samoa at the 2018 Summer Youth Olympics

References

Nations at the 2018 Commonwealth Games
Samoa at the Commonwealth Games
2018 in Samoan sport